The Staines–Windsor line is a suburban railway line in England which branches from the Waterloo to Reading Line at Staines-upon-Thames in Surrey and runs to Windsor in Berkshire. Passenger services on the line are operated by South Western Railway.

History 
The line was electrified in 1930 at 660 V DC (since raised to 750 V) on the third rail system by the Southern Railway.

In the late 1890s, a 3/4 mile single-track branch line was constructed across Staines Moor to supply fuel to a Metropolitan Water Board pumping station. Use of the line had ceased by 1955 and the track has since been lifted.

Connections to Staines West branch 
The L&SWR opposed connection with the Staines West branch but three separate connections have existed. The earliest was through the sidings of the Staines Linoleum Company and would have required use of turntables or reversals to pass wagons between the lines. In World War II a single track spur was laid from just south of  facing up on the Staines to Windsor Line as a diversionary route should cross-London routes be blocked by bombing; this link existed from 23 June 1940 to 16 December 1947 but was little used. The last, laid in 1981 when the Staines West branch was severed by the M25 motorway, was to an oil terminal built in the former goods yard of Staines West station and lasted until 1991.

Services 
The service frequency is two trains per hour in each direction every day except early on Sunday mornings when it is one per hour. From Windsor to London Waterloo takes about 55 minutes, some 20 minutes longer than the quickest journeys to London Paddington from the other station at Windsor, Windsor & Eton Central, although according to Network Rail timetables, the journey time to many central London locations is similar from both stations.

The Sunday service is roughly the same, but limited services pass through Wraysbury and Sunnymeads without stopping on this day.

Services on the line run beyond Staines to London Waterloo, running a fast service which calls at these stations:
 Ashford
 
 
 
 Richmond
 
 
 Vauxhall
 London Waterloo

Rolling stock

Services are normally operated by Class 458/5s and Class 707s, although Class 455s are occasionally used too. Trains run with 8 or 10 cars, but sometimes run with 4 or 5 cars.

The platforms at Sunnymeads and Datchet are too short for the long trains. At these stations selective door opening is used to prevent passengers alighting from the rearmost coaches.

Proposed enhancements 

A 2008 proposal was for the AirTrack scheme to provide a new link to Heathrow, including a station near the site of the former Staines High Street railway station. Although Airtrack was dropped by BAA, it has not died altogether as in 2011 Wandsworth Council proposed 'AirTrack Lite' and in September 2013, the Airports Commission wrote to the Department for Transport saying:

The Windsor Link Railway also proposes a solution for southern rail access to Heathrow as well as linking to Slough via a tunnel in Windsor.

References

External links 
 

Rail transport in Berkshire
Railway lines opened in 1849
Railway lines in South East England
1849 establishments in England